"The Revolution" (styled THE REVOLUTION) is a single by Japanese group Exile Tribe. It was released on August 20, 2014. It debuted in number one on the weekly Oricon Singles Chart, selling 321,879 copies. It was the 9th best-selling single of the year in Japan, with 573,268 copies.

Track listing

CD 
 THE REVOLUTION
 Vocal：EXILE TAKAHIRO, EXILE NESMITH, EXILE SHOKICHI, Ryuji Imaichi, Hiroomi Tosaka, Ryōta Katayose, Ryūto Kazuhara
 I Wish For You (EXILE TRIBE New Arrange Cover Version)
 Vocal：EXILE TAKAHIRO, EXILE NESMITH, EXILE SHOKICHI, Ryuji Imaichi, Hiroomi Tosaka
 THE REVOLUTION (Instrumental)
 I Wish For You (Instrumental)

References 

Songs about revolutions
2014 singles
2014 songs
Oricon Weekly number-one singles
Rhythm Zone singles